Trunks Integrated Record Keeping System (TIRKS) is an operations support system from Telcordia Technologies (since acquired by Ericsson, Inc.), originally developed by the Bell System during the late 1970s.  It  was developed for inventory and order control management of interoffice trunk circuits that interconnect telephone switches.  It grew to encompass and automate many functions required to build the ever-expanding data transport network. Supporting circuits from POTS and 150 baud modems up through T1, DS3, SONET and DWDM, it continues to evolve today, and unlike many software technologies today, provides complete backward compatibility.  TIRKS was recently updated with a Java GUI, XML API, and WORD Sketch, which provides graphical views of the TIRKS Work Order Record and Details Document as well as SONET and DWDM networks.  When TIRKS became a registered trademark in 1987, it became technically improper to use it as an acronym.  TIRKS was one of many OSS technologies transferred to Bell Communications Research as part of the Modification of Final Judgment related to the AT&T divestiture on January 1, 1984.  In the 1990s, the Facility and Equipment Planning System (FEPS) and Planning Workstation System (PWS) products were incorporated into the Telcordia TIRKS CE System. TIRKS is still in use at AT&T, Verizon, CenturyLink/Lumen Technologies, and altafiber.  

Telecommunications systems